Seybah Dagoma (born 9 June 1978 in Nantes, France) is a French lawyer and politician of the Socialist Party who served as a member of the French National Assembly on 17 June 2012, representing the department of Paris.

Early life and education
Born to immigrants from Chad in Nantes in 1978, Dagoma grew up in a low-income housing project in Sarcelles. She studied law.

Career
In parliament, Dagoma served on the Committee on Foreign Affairs and the Committee on European Affairs. She was also her parliamentary group’s rapporteur on foreign trade. In her addition to her committee assignments, Dagoma was part of the National Assembly’s friendship groups with India, South Africa and Turkey.

During her time in parliament, Dagoma was the only member of sub-Saharan immigrant background.

Since 2016, Dagoma has been serving as president of Business France.

Other activities
 Terra Nova, Member of the Board of Directors

References

1978 births
Living people
French people of Chadian descent
Politicians from Nantes
Socialist Party (France) politicians
Black French politicians
Women members of the National Assembly (France)
Deputies of the 14th National Assembly of the French Fifth Republic
21st-century French women politicians